John Gustav Henriksson (30 May 1883 – 1 November 1948) was a Finnish swimmer, who competed in two events at the 1908 Summer Olympics.

Sport

Olympics

National 

He won gold in 4 × 50 metre freestyle relay at the 1908 Finnish championships.

He was a member of two clubs:
 Vaasan Uimaseura, an honorary member since 1922
 Helsingfors Simsällskap. An honorary member since 1937. Chairman in 1914–1916 and a board member in 1909–1940.

He was the secretary of Finnish Swimming Federation in 1908–1909 and 1916.

Occupation 

Henriksson graduated as a physical education teacher in 1920 and worked as one in 1909–1948.

He was a copy editor in the magazine Finskt Iddrottsblad and a sports reporter in the newspaper Hufvudstadsbladet.

References

External links
 

1883 births
1948 deaths
Finnish male backstroke swimmers
Olympic swimmers of Finland
Swimmers at the 1908 Summer Olympics
Swimmers from Helsinki
Finnish male freestyle swimmers
Finnish male breaststroke swimmers